The Consolidated PB4Y-2 Privateer is an American World War II and Korean War era patrol bomber of the United States Navy derived from the Consolidated B-24 Liberator. The Navy had been using B-24s with only minor modifications as the PB4Y-1 Liberator, and along with maritime patrol Liberators used by RAF Coastal Command this type of patrol plane was proven successful. A fully navalised design was desired, and Consolidated developed a dedicated long-range patrol bomber in 1943, designated PB4Y-2 Privateer. In 1951, the type was redesignated P4Y-2 Privateer. A further designation change occurred in September 1962, when the remaining Navy Privateers (all having previously been converted to drone configuration as P4Y-2K) were redesignated QP-4B.

Design and development

The Privateer was externally similar to the Liberator, but the fuselage was longer to accommodate a flight engineer's station, and it had a tall single vertical stabilizer rather than the B-24's twin tail configuration. The Navy wanted a flight engineer crewmember to reduce pilot fatigue on long duration over water patrols. The single vertical tail was adopted from the USAAF's canceled B-24N design (and was slightly taller on the Privateer) because it would increase stability at low to medium altitudes for maritime patrol. The Ford Motor Company, which produced B-24s for the United States Army Air Forces, had earlier built an experimental variant (B-24K) using a single tail. Aircraft handling was improved. The single tail design was used on the B-32 Dominator and PB4Y-2 and was slated for the US Army Air Forces' proposed B-24N production model to be built by Ford, but that order (for several thousand bombers) was canceled on 31 May 1945.

Defensive armament on the PB4Y-2 was increased to twelve .50-in (12.7 mm) M2 Browning machine guns in six power operated turrets (two dorsal, two waist, nose and tail); the B-24's ventral, retractable Sperry ball turret was omitted. Turbosuperchargers were not fitted to the Privateer's engines since maritime patrol missions were not usually flown at high altitude, improving performance and also saving weight.

The navigator's astrodome was moved from its (B-24/PB4Y-1) position on the aircraft's upper nose to behind the first dorsal gun turret. Electronic countermeasure (ECM), communication and radar antennas also protruded or were enclosed in fairings at various locations on the fuselage of the Privateer, including a manually retractable AN/APS-2 radome behind the nose wheel well.

The Navy eventually took delivery of 739 Privateers, the majority after the end of the war. Several PB4Y-2 squadrons saw operational service in the Pacific theater through August 1945 in the reconnaissance, search and rescue, electronic countermeasures, communication relay, and anti-shipping roles (the latter with the "Bat" radar-guided bomb).

Operational history
The Privateer entered U.S. Navy service during late 1944, Patrol Bomber Squadrons 118 and 119 (VPB-118 and VPB-119) being the first Fleet squadrons to equip with the aircraft. The first overseas deployment began on 6 January 1945, when VPB-118 left for operations in the Marianas. On 2 March 1945 VPB-119 began "offensive search" missions out of Clark Field, Luzon in the Philippines, flying sectored searches of the seas and coastlines extending from the Gulf of Tonkin in the south, along the Chinese coast, and beyond Okinawa in the north.

Privateers were used as typhoon/hurricane hunters from 1945 to the mid-1950s. One aircraft, designated BuNo 59415 of VPB-119, went down when it experienced mechanical trouble while investigating a Category 1 typhoon near Batan Island in the Philippines. It attempted to land on the island, but was unable to do so and crashed. It was one of only six hurricane hunter flights that were ever lost, and the only one found. Another P4Y-2S, designated BuNo 59716 of Squadron VW-3 (formerly VJ-1), was lost during reconnaissance of Super Typhoon Doris on 16 December 1953.  Flying out of NAS Agana, Guam, the Privateer with a crew of nine was tracking Typhoon Doris with sustained winds of 90-95 knots near the small island of Agrihan north of Guam. No sign of the crew nor wreckage of the plane was ever found.

PB4Y-2s were also used during the Korean War to fly "Firefly" night illumination missions dropping parachute flares to detect North Korean and Chinese seaborne infiltrators.  In addition, Privateers were used by the U.S. Navy for signals intelligence (SIGINT) flights off of the coast of the Soviet Union and the People's Republic of China. On 8 April 1950, Soviet La-11 fighters shot down a U.S. Navy PB4Y-2 Privateer (BuNo 59645) over the Baltic Sea, off the coast of Liepāja, Latvia.  Named the Turbulent Turtle, the aircraft was assigned to Patrol Squadron 26 (VP-26), Det A.

The French Aéronavale was supplied with Privateers via the Mutual Defense Assistance Act, which they used as bombers during the Indochina War and later operated out of Bizerte, Tunisia and Algiers.

All U.S. Navy PB4Y-2s were retired by 1954, though unarmed PB4Y-2G Privateers served until 1958 with the Coast Guard before being auctioned off for salvage.

The Navy dropped the patrol-bomber designation in 1951 and its remaining PB4Y-2s were redesignated P4Y-2 Privateer. (The earlier XP4Y-1 Corregidor was a completely different design, based on the Consolidated Model 31 twin-engine flying boat.) PB4Y-2s were still being used as drones in the 1950s/early 1960s, designated PB4Y-2K, and P4Y-2K after 1951. They were then redesignated QP-4B under the 1962 United States Tri-Service aircraft designation system, becoming part of the new patrol number series between the Lockheed P-3 Orion and the Martin P-5 Marlin.

A number of PB4Ys were supplied to the Republic of China Air Force for use in missions over the People's Republic of China.  One was shot down by ground fire on 12 September 1954, near Xiamen, People's Republic of China. The crew of nine was killed.  Another was shot down on 15 February 1961 by Burmese Hawker Sea Fury fighter aircraft, near the Thai-Burmese border, killing five members of the crew. Two other crew members were taken prisoner. This aircraft was carrying supplies for Chinese Kuomintang forces fighting in northern Burma.

Privateers in aerial firefighting

A limited number of refitted PB4Ys and P4Ys continued in civilian service as airtankers, dropping fire retardant on forest fires throughout the western United States. On 18 July 2002, one such refitted P4Y, BuNo 66260 (seen in picture to right) operated by Hawkins and Powers Aviation of Greybull, Wyoming broke up in flight while fighting a wildfire near Rocky Mountain National Park. Both crew members were killed in the accident, and the Federal Aviation Administration temporarily grounded all large air tankers in the region. Despite the fact that the crash was the result of poor maintenance, and a much newer C-130 based aircraft also broke apart due to similar stresses, all remaining Privateers were retired. (See 2002 United States airtanker crashes.)

Variants
YPB4Y-2 prototypes, three built.
PB4Y-2 main production version, 736 built.
PB4Y-2B PB4Y-2s equipped to launch ASM-N-2 Bat air-to-surface missiles. Redesignated P4Y-2B in 1951.
PB4Y-2M PB4Y-2s converted for weather reconnaissance. Redesignated P4Y-2M in 1951.
PB4Y-2S PB4Y-2s equipped with anti-submarine radar. Redesignated P4Y-2S in 1951.
PB4Y-2G PB4Y-2s converted for air-sea rescue and weather reconnaissance duties with the U.S. Coast Guard. Redesignated P4Y-2G in 1951.
PB4Y-2K PB4Y-2s converted to target drones. Redesignated P4Y-2K in 1951 and QP-4B in 1962.

Operators

 United States Navy
 United States Coast Guard

Surviving aircraft
Airworthy
PB4Y-2
 66300 – based at Yanks Air Museum in Chino, California.

 66302 – based in Casa Grande, Arizona.
On display
PB4Y-2
 59701 –  Museum of Flight and Aerial Firefighting in Greybull, Wyoming.
 59819 – Pima Air and Space Museum in Tucson Arizona.
 59876 – Yankee Air Museum in Belleville, Michigan.
 59882 –  Museum of Flight and Aerial Firefighting in Greybull, Wyoming.
 59932 (nose only) Over Exposed – The National WWII Museum in New Orleans, Louisiana.  Displayed as a B-24D.
 66261 – National Naval Aviation Museum at Naval Air Station Pensacola, Florida.

Specifications (PB4Y-2)

See also

References
Notes

Bibliography

 Bridgeman, Leonard. "The Consolidated Vultee Privateer." Jane's Fighting Aircraft of World War II. London: Studio, 1946.'.

External links

 Manual: (1945) Flight Manual PB4Y-2 Airplane
 Consolidated PB4Y-2 'Privateer' – Aviation Enthusiast Corner
 Warbird Alley
 Globalsecurity.org
 Aeroweb's PB4Y Location List
 Aeroweb's PB4Y at Lone Star Flight Museum – Lone Star Flight Museum

PB4Y
1940s United States patrol aircraft
World War II patrol aircraft of the United States
Four-engined tractor aircraft
High-wing aircraft
Aircraft first flown in 1943
Four-engined piston aircraft